Dr. Emil Mayer   (October 3, 1871 – June 8, 1938) was an Austrian photographer, lawyer, inventor, and businessperson.

Biography

Early life 
Emil Mayer was born on October 3, 1871, in Neubydzow, Bohemia (now Nový Bydžov, Czech Republic) to Leopold and Anna Mayer. In the summer of 1882, Mayer moved with his family to Vienna, Austria, where “his father set up business as a merchant.”

From 1891 to 1896, Mayer studied law at the University of Vienna, where he earned the Juris Doctor.

Personal life 

While still a student, Mayer left the Jewish community and converted to Catholicism. On March 8, 1894, he was baptized at the  under the name Robert Emil. The painter  was his godfather.

Marriage 
On June 6, 1903, he married Elisabeth Deutsch (March 18, 1882 – June 8, 1938).

Death 
To escape persecution from the Nazi regime after the annexation of Austria in March 1938, Mayer and his wife died by suicide in their home (BöcklinStraße 12) in Vienna on June 8, 1938.

Career 

After Mayer completed his studies at the University of Vienna, he established a law practice at Salvatorgasse 10 in Vienna.

Mayer's first experience in photography was as an amateur, and he was a member of several Viennese photographer associations that focused on artistic photography. His artistic photos include documentary images of Wienerstraße images.

Mayer was an honorary member of many domestic and foreign photographers' clubs. He also authored a textbook and was awarded several patents for photographic devices.

DREM-Zentrale 
Finally, Mayer left this he law firm and founded a photographic technology company DREM-Zentrale with Nikolaus Benedik. The company's name was an abbreviation of DR. E. Mayer. International branches of the company included, DREM Products Corporation in New York and DREM Products Ltd. in London, England.

Published works 
 1912 – Wurstelprater by Felix Salten with 75 photographs by Emil Mayer.
 1912 – Das Bromöldruckverfahren. Halle a.S.: Knapp, 1912.
 1923 – Bromoil Printing and Bromoil Transfer. Boston, Mass: American Photographic Publishing Co., 1923. Translated from the seventh German edition by Frank Roy Fraprie, FRPS (1874 – 1951), editor of American Photography.
 1927 – Bromöldruck und -Umdruck. (Enzyklopädie der Photographie; 81). 10. und 11. ergänzte Auflage. Knapp, Halle (Saale) 1927.
 1927 – "A Manual of Bromoil & Transfer." Practical Photography, no. 12, 1927. Translated by Joseph M. Bing.

Honors, awards and distinctions 

 Photographic Society of Philadelphia – Honorary Member, December 13, 1927

Gallery

See also 

 Oil print process
 Street photography

References

Notes

Sources

Further reading 
  (Catalog of the exhibition Prater Cinema World: Film Pleasures in the Old Prater at the Pratermuseum, Vienna, July 8-September 18, 2005).

  (Ein Vortrag Emil Mayers über den Wiener Wurstelprater wurde im  (ÖVA) wiederentdeckt).

 

  Catalog of an exhibition at Kulturhaus, Graz; Museum des Zwanzigsten Jahrhunderts (Museum of the Twentieth Century), Vienna; Galerie im Taxis-Palais, Innsbruck, 1973–1974.

External links 

 
 The Royal Photographic Society. The Photographic Journal. vol. 65 (Nov. 1925, p. 498), vol. 66 (1926), vol. 67 (1927), vol. 68 (1928), vol. 70 (1930), vol. 74 (1934), 78 (1938), vol. 87 (1947).
 Emil Mayer at Albertina (Vienna, Austria)
 Elisabeth Mayer at Albertina (Vienna, Austria)
 Emil Mayer at Biobibliografie zur Fotografie in Österreich der Albertina (Vienna, Austria)
 Elisabeth Mayer at Biobibliografie zur Fotografie in Österreich der Albertina (Vienna, Austria)
 Emil Mayer at Austrian Theatre Museum (Theatermuseum Wien) (Vienna, Austria)
 Emil Mayer at Davison Art Center, Wesleyan University (Middletown, Connecticut)
 Emil Mayer at George Eastman Museum (Rochester, New York)
 Emil Mayer at Harvard Art Museum (Cambridge, Massachusetts)
 Emil Mayer at Lee Gallery (Winchester, Massachusetts)
 Emil Mayer at Metropolitan Museum of Art (New York City, New York)
  (MoMA) (New York City, New York)
 Emil Mayer at Vienna Museum (Wien Museum) (Vienna, Austria)
 Emil Mayer at Österreichisches Volkshochschularchiv (Vienna, Austria). Color photograph in collection.

1871 births
1938 deaths
1938 suicides
20th-century Austrian photographers
20th-century male artists
Photographers from Vienna
Artists from Vienna
Lawyers from Vienna
Pictorialists
Street photographers
University of Vienna alumni
Royal Photographic Society members
Fellows of the Royal Photographic Society
Suicides by Jews during the Holocaust
Austrian Jews who died in the Holocaust
Suicides in Austria